Francis Field Saucier (born May 28, 1926) is an American former professional baseball player, an outfielder who played two months of the  baseball season for the St. Louis Browns.

In his eighteen-game major league career, Saucier had one hit in 14 at-bats, giving him a .071 batting average. He also had three walks, scored four runs, and had one run batted in. This attracted the attention of Veeck, who signed him in July 1951, paying him a substantial bonus to return to baseball. In 1950, Saucier batted .343 for the San Antonio Missions to lead the Texas League in hitting, and won The Sporting News Minor League Player of the Year Award. An injury in 1951 and two years in the United States Navy during the Korean War (in addition to 38 months during World War II) short-circuited his playing time, and he never played in the majors again.

Saucier graduated from Westminster College in Fulton, Missouri with a degree in math and physics; the baseball field there is named after him. The site is named Frank Saucier Field, a reflection of his full name Francis Field Saucier.

References

1926 births
Living people
People from Franklin County, Missouri
Westminster Blue Jays baseball players
Major League Baseball outfielders
St. Louis Browns players
Baseball players from Missouri
United States Navy personnel of World War II
United States Navy personnel of the Korean War
Baltimore Orioles (IL) players
Belleville Stags players
San Antonio Missions players
Wichita Falls Spudders players